Raco may refer to:

 RACO, Representative Association of Commissioned Officers, Ireland
 Raco, Michigan, U.S.
 Danny Raco (born 1979), Australian actor
 Rob Raco (born 1989), Canadian actor
 Raco Army Airfield, a former airfield near Sault Ste. Marie, Michigan, U.S.

See also
 Racoș (disambiguation)